No. 174 (Mauritius) Squadron RAF was a Royal Air Force Squadron that was a fighter-bomber unit in World War II.

History

Formation in World War II
The squadron formed on 2 March 1942 at RAF Manston and equipped with Hurricanes and then rocket armed Typhoons in April 1943. They participated in the Dieppe Raid, and were involved in attacks on shipping and V-1 flying bomb launch sites from several bases in the UK. The squadron moved to Camilly, France after D-Day and then withdrew back to the UK, before joining the allied advance across Europe. The squadron disbanded in Germany on 8 April 1945 upon renumbering as No. 137 Squadron RAF, then reformed for two further brief periods and was equipped with Tempests in September 1945 before final disbandment on 31 March 1946 at Faßberg, Germany.

Aircraft operated

References

External links

 History of No.'s 171–175 Squadrons at RAF Web
 174 Squadron history on the official RAF website

174
Military units and formations established in 1942